Mike Singer (born 20 January 2000 in Kehl, Baden-Württemberg) is a German pop singer and songwriter.

Biography
Growing up as the son of Russian German parents in Offenburg, Singer started to develop a musical career from the age of twelve. Self-taught, he composed and wrote self-produced songs at home and cover of well-known hits. In 2013, he auditioned for the German version of The Voice Kids joining Team Lena Meyer-Landrut, but was voted out following the Battle Round.

In 2014, he released the album Only You mostly in English, but with an additional track in German and 2 remixes. In 2015 (following continued online success), he released his EP Nur mit Dir with 6 tracks in German. He has attracted over 1.4 million fans on Instagram, 360,000 followers on Facebook and over 580,000 subscribers to his YouTube channel.

He was signed to Warner Music Group in February 2017, and both his first album on the label Karma and the follow up album Deja Vu in January 2018 have both reached number 1 on the German Albums Chart, as well as charting in Austria and Switzerland. The German newspaper Die Welt called him the German Justin Bieber. In 2017, he also appeared in the series Spotlight in the role of Luke.

Discography

Albums

EPs

Singles

Featured in

Other songs
2015: "Heal"
2016: "Bring mich zum Singen"
2017: "Egal"
2017: "Nein"
2017: "Galaxie" (feat. Sierra Kidd)
2017: "FlashBacks"
2020: "Paranoid"
2020: "100Tausend"
2022: "Never Gonna Give You Up" (with Alex Christensen and the Berlin Orchestra)

Filmography
2017: Spotlight (Online series) -- as Luke
2019: Der Lehrer—as Felix
2020: The Masked Singer—as Wuschel (Season 2 runner-up)
2021: Deutschland sucht den Superstar—Judge (Season 18)
2022: Let's Dance—Contestant (season 15)

Awards

References

External links

Official website

German songwriters
2000 births
Living people
People from Kehl
21st-century German male singers